Bacas may refer to:

 Belgian Academy Council of Applied Sciences
 Bazas, a commune of the Gironde département, in southwestern France

See also
Baca (disambiguation)